A four-year junior college was a type of educational institution in the United States in the 20th century that provided education from the 11th to the 14th grades, corresponding to the last two years of high school and the first two years of college. Although these are now considered secondary education and tertiary education respectively, advocates of the four-year junior college argued that all four years should be considered part of secondary education.

The first proposal for four-year junior colleges was made in 1894, by George A. Merrill, Director of the Wilmerding School of Industrial Arts in San Francisco, California. The first law formally authorizing such institutions was enacted in 1908. However, the idea took some time to catch on. The first four-year junior was established in Texas in 1923 as Hillsboro Junior College, known today as Hill College.  Many others were established soon thereafter, but even in 1931, they numbered fewer than ten nationwide.

The four-year junior college movement was closely associated with a broader movement for a 6-4-4 educational system: six years of elementary school, four years of junior high school, and four years of junior college (or "senior school"). Under this plan, graduation from junior college would "mark the end of the period of general education", and students who wished would then proceed to more specialized education leading to the bachelor's degree and beyond.

Around its peak in 1942, the movement embraced 34 institutions nationwide, enrolling about 16,000 students in total.  Five of these institutions and 8,000 of the students were in California. The development of the movement in California was aided by a state law allowing individual districts to adopt a 6-4-4 plan. Seven did so and established four-year public junior colleges: Pasadena (1928), Compton (1932), Ventura (1937), Pomona (1942), Napa (1942), Vallejo (1945), Stockton (1948).  From the late–1940s to the early–1960s, all of these localities changed back to a traditional high-school system. The last holdout was Napa, which reverted in 1964.

Arguments
Advocates of four-year junior colleges advanced ten arguments in their system's favor:
 Four-year junior colleges could deal better with the unique psychological challenges of adolescence.
 Unnecessary overlap between high-school and college coursework could be eliminated.
 Capital and maintenance costs could be reduced.
 Student time could be saved, with "superior" students finishing in three years rather than four.
 Students could be better prepared for semiprofessional work.
 Better student counseling could be provided over a four-year period than in a two-year junior college.
 Localities that could not support a two-year junior college due to scale would be able to support a four-year one.
 The four-year junior college would more closely resemble the successful German Gymnasium system.
 The legal dropout age of 16 makes the 10th grade a more logical breaking point than the 12th.
 A four-year junior institution can attract better teachers and staff than a two-year one.

List of four-year junior colleges

This is a list of schools that at one time adopted a four-year junior college curriculum.

Aftermath

Four-year junior colleges and the 6-4-4 movement were never able to achieve the critical mass required to shift the national educational system, and had faded away by the mid-1960s. A number of problems have been cited for the inability of the idea to take root, including problems with inter-institutional competition, resistance to change, and vested interests.  In addition, "one of the greatest problems" was the incompatibility between the restrictions imposed by law on high school students in the institution's first two years and the greater freedom desired by  students in the institution's second two years. The differing regulatory and accreditation requirements often also meant that students in the last two years of the school could not take the same classes as students in the first two years for equivalent credit.

Perhaps as a result of these issues, in some institutions, such as Shimer College in Illinois, the four-year junior college essentially functioned as two separate institutions, with most students either transferring in or out after the 12th grade, and only a handful of students continuing through the full four years.  As a result, many of the economies envisioned by advocates of the four-year junior college system could not be achieved.

The public junior colleges that had adopted four-year junior college curricula, such as those in California and Texas, chiefly returned to a two-year junior college model; many are now community colleges.  Many of the private colleges that had adopted the model are now four-year colleges.

The problem of providing a smooth transition between high school and college remained, however, and was tackled by Robert Maynard Hutchins, first at the University of Chicago and later nationwide through the Fund for the Advancement of Education.  Hutchins' approach involved eliminating the last two years of high school entirely for the top 25% of students, and allowing them to proceed directly to college and obtain their bachelor's degree at the age at which they would ordinarily have been only two years through college.  The plan faced stiff resistance from a variety of entrenched constituencies, including university faculty and high school principals, and most such early entrance to college programs disappeared, reappearing decades later as a form of gifted education.  However, at Shimer College in Chicago, which had previously been a women's four-year junior college, an early entrance program descended directly from the Hutchins program remains in place.

Works cited

, reprinted in Diener 1986, pages 99–115.

References

See also
 Junior college
 Secondary school

 
Types of university or college
Education reform